Rafael Alejandro Moreno Cárdenas (born 25 April 1975) is a Mexican politician who has been the President of the Institutional Revolutionary Party (PRI) since 2019. He is best known as "Alito".

Biography and personal life 
He was born in 25 April 1975, in San Francisco de Campeche, Campeche.

He is married to Christelle Castañón, and has two children with her.

He is a Bachelor of Laws, and a graduate of the Institute of Superior Technological Studies René Descartes (ITES René Descartes). He also has a diploma on electoral law, given by the Autonomous University of Campeche.

Political life 
He was Governor of Campeche from September 2015 to July 2019, when he solicited license to run for president of the Institutional Revolutionary Party (PRI), to which he is affiliated.  he served as Deputy of both the LIX and LXII Legislatures of the Mexican Congress as a National List Deputy. He also served as Senator during the LX and LXI Legislatures.

Party trajectory 
He's been an active member of the Institutional Revolutionary Party (PRI) since 1991.

During this time, he has occupied the following positions within his party in Campeche: a State Counselor, a Municipal Councilor, President of the Municipal Directive Committee (CDM) of the Popular Revolutionary Youth of the National Confederation of Popular Organizations (CNOP), and President of the State Directive Committee of the Popular Revolutionary Youth of the CNOP. Nationally, he has occupied the following positions: Organization Secretary of the National Executive Committee (CEN, for its acronym in Spanish) of the Revolutionary Youth Front and National Coordinator of the Revolutionary Youth Front of PRI.

In 2019, he was unanimously elected as president of the Permanent Conference of Political Parties of Latin America and the Caribbean (COPPPAL) for the 2019-2023 period, though he was reelected for the 2022-2026 period in mid-2022. A reason for why the election was called a year early has not been found.

Administrative trajectory 
In 2002 he was elected as síndico of judicial affairs in the Municipio of Campeche.

Business trajectory 
During his term as Governor of Campeche (2015-2019), he acquired several local newspapers, including El Sur,  Novedades, El Expreso de Campeche, and the digital news-site webcampeche.com. Local newspapers and magazines of Campeche and Veracruz have also pointed out he allegedly bought the TV channel Mayavisión using his brother, Gabriel Emigdio Moreno Cárdenas, as an intermediary.

Controversies 
Amid criticism about mishandling funds during his campaign, on 13 July 2019, Moreno Cárdenas requested to be relieved of his duties as governor so that he could run for president of the PRI and then was elected. The local Congress named Carlos Miguel Aysa González in his place. His tenure as president of his party has been full of controversy, especially due to the audioscandals released by the current Governor of Campeche, Layda Sansores. Although he sought legal protection against the release of more audios, because they were allegedly acquired illegally, Courts in several states have rejected his petitions.Recently, both critics from within his party and experts have claimed the hits to his reputation threaten the viability of the coalition Va por México (which includes the National Action Party (PAN), the PRI, and the Party of the Democratic Revolution (PRD)), and have called for him to resign. Alito has rejected such calls, justifying his decision on the fact that his term as president of the party ends in 2023.

References

1975 births
Living people
Politicians from Campeche City
Members of the Senate of the Republic (Mexico)
Members of the Chamber of Deputies (Mexico)
Institutional Revolutionary Party politicians
21st-century Mexican politicians
Governors of Campeche
Autonomous University of Campeche alumni